Lijia is a town in Shunqing District, Nanchong, Sichuan province, China. , it administers Lijia Residential Community and the following 18 villages:
Jinhuanjing Village
Shuiguanyin Village
Caobachang Village
Wulongqiao Village
Qingping Village
Yeyatan Village
Huaguangmiao Village
Longfeng Village
Juandongmen Village
Longshanguan Village
Xinqiao Village
Chongxianjing Village
Lihua Village
Daoqiangxin Village
Taipingshan Village
Huojianqiao Village
Guihuahu Village
Dayanshan Village

References

Township-level divisions of Sichuan
Nanchong